The 2019 Asian Men's Volleyball Championship  was the twentieth staging of the Asian Men's Volleyball Championship, a biennial international volleyball tournament organised by the Asian Volleyball Confederation (AVC) with Islamic Republic of Iran Volleyball Federation (IRIVF). The tournament was held in Tehran, Iran from 13 to 21 September 2019.

Top eight teams which had not yet qualified to the 2020 Summer Olympics qualified for the 2020 Asian Olympic Qualification Tournament.

Qualification
Following the AVC regulations, The maximum of 16 teams in all AVC events will be selected by

1 team for the host country
10 teams based on the final standing of the previous edition
5 teams from each of 5 zones (with a qualification tournament if needed)

Qualified teams

 Iran qualified as hosts, is originally top 10 of previous edition. The spot was reallocated to the next highest ranked nation, Thailand.
 Vietnam originally qualified, but declined to enter.
 Turkmenistan was to play India and Sri Lanka in the Central Asia qualification tournament. However, Turkmenistan was barred from playing due to violating competition regulations prior to tournament. Both India and Sri Lanka qualified.
 Pakistan were granted entry and was not among the three teams originally set to participate in the cancelled Central Asia qualifiers.

Pools composition

Preliminary round
Teams were seeded in the first two positions of each pool following the serpentine system according to their final standing of the 2017 edition. AVC reserved the right to seed the hosts as head of Pool A regardless of the final standing of the 2017 edition. All teams not seeded were drawn in Bangkok, Thailand on 19 February 2019. Final standings of the 2017 edition are shown in brackets except the hosts who ranked 5th.

Draw

Classification round

Squads

Venues

Pool standing procedure
 Number of matches won
 Match points
 Sets ratio
 Points ratio
 If the tie continues as per the point ratio between two teams, the priority will be given to the team which won the last match between them. When the tie in points ratio is between three or more teams, a new classification of these teams in the terms of points 1, 2 and 3 will be made taking into consideration only the matches in which they were opposed to each other.

Match won 3–0 or 3–1: 3 match points for the winner, 0 match points for the loser
Match won 3–2: 2 match points for the winner, 1 match point for the loser

Preliminary round
All times are Iran Daylight Time (UTC+04:30).

Pool A

|}

|}

Pool B

|}

|}

Pool C

|}

|}

Pool D

|}

|}

Classification round
All times are Iran Daylight Time (UTC+04:30).
The results and the points of the matches between the same teams that were already played during the preliminary round shall be taken into account for the classification round.

Pool E

|}

|}

Pool F

|}

|}

Pool G

|}

|}

Pool H

|}

|}

Final round
All times are Iran Daylight Time (UTC+04:30).

13th–16th places

13th–16th semifinals

|}

15th place match

|}

13th place match

|}

9th–12th places

9th–12th semifinals

|}

11th place match

|}

9th place match

|}

Final eight

Quarterfinals

|}

5th–8th semifinals

|}

Semifinals

|}

7th place match

|}

5th place match

|}

3rd place match

|}

Final

|}

Final standing

Awards

Most Valuable Player
 Thomas Edgar
Best Setter
 Saeid Marouf
Best Outside Spikers
 Yūki Ishikawa
 Samuel Walker

Best Middle Blockers
 Shin Yung-suk
 Mohammad Mousavi
Best Opposite Spiker
 Amir Ghafour
Best Libero
 Tomohiro Yamamoto

References

External links
Official website
Regulations
Squads

Asian Men's Volleyball Championship
International volleyball competitions hosted by Iran
Asian Men's Volleyball Championship
Vol